Wells-Twyford House is a historic home located near Sistersville, Tyler County, West Virginia. It was built in 1854, and is a two-story, five bay, I house plan dwelling with a rear ell and Greek Revival-style details.  It has a gable roof and features a one-story, 26 foot long front porch.  Also on the property is a two-story frame garage that may have been used as a barn at the beginning of the 20th century.

It was listed on the National Register of Historic Places in 1991.

References

Houses on the National Register of Historic Places in West Virginia
Greek Revival houses in West Virginia
Houses completed in 1854
Houses in Tyler County, West Virginia
National Register of Historic Places in Tyler County, West Virginia
I-houses in West Virginia